A flare gun, also known as a Very pistol or signal pistol, is a large-bore handgun that discharges flares, blanks and smoke. The flare gun is typically used to produce a distress signal.

Types 

The most common type of flare gun is a Very (sometimes spelled Verey), which was named after Edward Wilson Very (1847–1910), an American naval officer who developed and popularized a single-shot breech-loading snub-nosed pistol that fired flares (Very lights). They have a single action trigger mechanism, hammer action, and a center fire pin. Modern varieties are frequently made out of durable plastic of a bright colour that makes them more conspicuous and easier to retrieve in an emergency and assists in distinguishing them from conventional firearms.

The Very pistol, typical of the type used in the Second World War, are of one inch bore (26.5mm), now known as "Calibre 4" for signal pistols. These are still available and more recent longer-barrel models can also fire parachute flares. Many newer models fire smaller 12-gauge flares. In countries where possession of firearms is strictly controlled, such as the United Kingdom, the use of Very pistols as emergency equipment on boats is less common than, for example, the United States. In such locations, distress flares are more commonly fired from single-shot tube devices which are then disposed of after use. These devices are fired by twisting or striking a pad on one end, but the contents are otherwise similar to a round from a flare gun, although the flares themselves are much larger and can burn brighter for longer. In the Russian Federation, which also has strict controls on firearms, a special tube-shaped flare launching device called a "Hunter's Signal" (Сигнал Охотника) is available. This is reusable but is deliberately designed in a way to avoid resemblance to a gun.

Flare guns may be used whenever someone needs to send a distress signal. The flares must be shot directly above, making the signal visible for a longer period of time and revealing the position of whoever is in need of assistance. There are four distinct flare calibers: 12-gauge (18.53mm), 25mm, 26.5mm, and 37mmthe first three being the most popular for boaters.

Use as weapons 

While not intended as a weapon, flare guns have been used as such in some situations. Towards the end of World War I during the Final Offensive of the Sinai and Palestine Campaign, on 19 October 1918 a German aircraft was destroyed on the ground by firing a Very light into the aircraft. The D.F.W. two-seater was first seen in the air; the first German aircraft since aerial fighting over Deraa on 16 and 17 September just prior to the beginning of the Battle of Sharon. The two-seater was forced to land and was destroyed after the German pilot and observer had moved to safety.

In 1942, a German pilot mistakenly landed at the Pembrey Airfield in Wales. The duty pilot, Sgt. Jeffreys, did not have a conventional weapon, so he grabbed a Flare pistol and used it to capture the German pilot, Oberleutnant Armin Faber.

In World War II, Germany manufactured grenades designed to be fired from adapted flare guns known as the Kampfpistole, or Sturmpistole in its final form. The weapon was designed to function as an anti-tank weapon but failed to perform to expectations due to the minuscule amount of TNT carried in the hollow charge projectiles.

In the later stages of the Korean War, on November 2 of 1951, Lieutenant Edward Mastronardi and his 28-man platoon of the Royal Canadian Regiment were occupying a spur halfway between UN and Chinese lines known as the Song-gok. During the night, Chinese infantry launched several attacks against the spur. During the second attack, Mastronardi personally shot two Chinese soldiers with his Inglis Hi-Power pistol, and killed a third with his flare gun.

Conversion kits 

Conversion kits are available intended to convert flare guns to accept conventional ammunition by use of barrel inserts. There are also 12 gauge inserts intended to allow use of rifle or pistol ammunition in conventional 12 gauge shotguns. Use of any of these devices in the Orion plastic 12 gauge flare gun is not recommended by the manufacturer and ATF tests have demonstrated that sometimes a single use results in a catastrophic failure. In the United States, if these conversion kits are used in a metal flare gun, the converted gun is considered to be a firearm by the ATF. If a rifled barrel insert is used, the converted firearm is classified as a pistol; if a smoothbore barrel insert is used, the converted firearm is classified as an AOW subject to the additional requirements of the NFA. Flare cartridges are low pressure compared to conventional ammunition and even metal flare guns are not designed or intended to be used with conventional ammunition. Conversion of a flare gun to fire conventional ammunition may also be restricted by local improvised firearm laws.

See also 

 37 mm flare

References

Further reading

External links 

 History of the Very pistol with many examples
 WW German signal-pistol grenades and their use by tank crews.

 
Rescue equipment
Optical communications